Tayan Bridge is a bridge which crosses Kapuas River in Sanggau, West Kalimantan, Indonesia. This bridge is a part of Trans-Kalimantan Highway (southern route) that connects West Borneo with Central Borneo. The bridge is one of the longest bridges in Borneo. The bridge construction project takes about 900 days. The bridge opened to traffic on 22 March 2016.

History 

Before the bridge was completed, vehicle crossing between Tayan and Piasak was served by two small ferries. It required 20 minutes to cross the river by ferry.

Construction 
Construction of the bridge started in September 2012. The construction project is mainly funded by loan from China (90%) and was built by China Road and Bridge Corporation. The bridge costs 740 billion rupiahs. The bridge was finished on 19 February 2016.

The bridge was inaugurated by President of Indonesia, Joko Widodo, and opened on 22 March 2016.

Description 

The total length of this bridge is 1,975 meters, while the width is about 11 meters, carries 3-lanes highway. The clearance of the bridge from the surface of river at the high water condition is 13 meters.

The construction of the bridge is divided into two parts. The first part is a 300 meters bridge from Tayan town to Tayan Island, and the second part is a 1,140 meters bridge from Tayan Island to Piasak. The bridge is expected to last for 100 years with maintenance.

References 

Buildings and structures in West Kalimantan
Transport in West Kalimantan
Bridges in Indonesia
Bridges completed in 2016
Arch bridges in Indonesia